A constitutional referendum was held in the United States Virgin Islands on 3 November 1981. The 30-member Constitutional Council was elected in 1980. The Council drew up and then adopted a draft constitution, but as with previous attempts in 1972 and 1979, the draft constitution was rejected by the voters.

Results

References

Referendums in the United States Virgin Islands
1981 in the United States Virgin Islands
1981 referendums
1981 elections in the Caribbean
Constitutional referendums